The Trade Union Centre of Workers of Rwanda is a national trade union center in Rwanda. It was founded in 1985 as the sole national center.

Since the 1991 establishment of a multi-party political system CESTRAR has declared its political independence.

CESTRAR is affiliated with the International Trade Union Confederation.

References

External links
 CESTRAR official site.

Trade unions in Rwanda
International Trade Union Confederation
Trade unions established in 1985
1985 establishments in Rwanda